Kyle Lee Hawley (born 11 May 2000) is an English professional footballer who plays as a forward for New Mills. He played previously for League Two club Morecambe.

Career
Hawley graduated through the Morecambe Academy to make his first-team debut on 1 April 2017, coming on as an 86th-minute substitute for Aaron McGowan in a 3–1 defeat at Cheltenham Town.

A one-year contract option was exercised by Morecambe at the end of the 2018–19 season.

He has undertaken a number of loan spells with non-league clubs - in August 2018 he joined Skelmersdale United, the following August he joined Witton Albion before in October joining Lancaster City and in January 2020 followed this with a spell at FC United of Manchester.  At the end of the season he was released by Morecambe following the end of his contract.

In June 2020 he joined Stalybridge Celtic before moving to Glossop North End in September. He recalled to the club in  October during the loan spell. before leaving the club in December 2020. He subsequently returned to Glossop North End.

In August 2021 he joined Mossley having played for the club in a number of pre-season friendlies.

Career statistics

References

2000 births
Living people
English footballers
Association football forwards
Morecambe F.C. players
English Football League players
Skelmersdale United F.C. players
Witton Albion F.C. players
Lancaster City F.C. players
F.C. United of Manchester players
Stalybridge Celtic F.C. players
Glossop North End A.F.C. players
Mossley A.F.C. players
New Mills A.F.C. players